WCSQ-LP (105.9 FM) was a radio station licensed to Cobleskill, New York, United States. Branded on air as "Radio Cobleskill," the station was awarded its license in January 2014 and first began broadcasting on October 16, 2016, featuring a music-intensive adult hits/hot adult contemporary format, as well as locally produced and syndicated specialty music and public affairs programming. As an LPFM station, it operated on a non-commercial basis, as per the terms of its license.

The station was owned and operated by Dialogos of Cobleskill, Incorporated, a non-profit organization based in Cobleskill which produces radio programming and podcasts, including Dialogos Radio. The station operated with an effective radiated power (ERP) of 100 watts from the WUCB-LD tower on Route 7 in Richmondville, New York, covering Cobleskill, Richmondville, and the surrounding communities.

The station went off the air on February 29, 2020 and turned in its license to the FCC on September 29, 2020.

References

External links
 

CSQ-LP
CSQ-LP
Radio stations established in 2016
2016 establishments in New York (state)
2020 disestablishments in New York (state)
Radio stations disestablished in 2020
Defunct radio stations in the United States
CSQ-LP